St. Thomas School, Leipzig is a co-educational and public boarding school in Leipzig, Saxony, Germany. It was founded by the Augustinians in 1212 and is one of the oldest schools in the world.

St. Thomas is known for its art, language and music education. Johann Sebastian Bach held the position of Thomaskantor from 1723 until his death in 1750. His responsibilities included providing young musicians for church services in Leipzig.
The Humanistic Gymnasium has a very long list of distinguished former students, including Richard Wagner (1813–1883) and many members of the Bach family, including Johann Sebastian Bach's son Carl Philipp Emanuel Bach (1714–1788).

From the 800-Year Anniversary Celebration in 2012 the Thomanerchor and St. Thomas School has been part of Forum Thomanum, an internationally oriented educational campus.

History 
St. Thomas School was founded in 1212 by Margrave Dietrich von Meißen (1162–1221) making it among the oldest schools in Europe.   It was run as schola pauperum, meaning a free school intended to benefit the poor, by the Canons Regular of St. Augustine. The St. Thomas Church was founded with the school. The St. Thomas School is first mentioned in documents dating to 1254.

In 1539 the city of Leipzig took over ownership of the school. All members (Thomaner) of the boys choir (Thomanerchor) attend the school along with other pupils. The Thomaner live in the school's own boarding school, Thomasalumnat.

The school's first building was in the present courtyard of the St. Thomas Church. In 1553 an outbuilding was built there. During Johann Sebastian Bach's time as Thomaskantor these buildings were extended; in 1829 they were reconstructed. In 1877 a new building was erected in the Schreberstraße to meet a shortage of space. In 1881 a new building for the boarding school was finished.

The school was used as a barracks by a Freikorps unit during the Kapp Putsch. The staff had little sympathy for Friedrich Ebert's government.

During the Nazi era the school continued its normal curricula. The school endured the bombings of the night of 3 December 1943 with only the gym and the buildings across from the boarding school being destroyed. The then-rector, Günther Ramin, decided to move the choir boys to the Königlich Sächsische Fürsten- und Landesschule Sankt Augustin school in Grimma. Because of this, and because most of the older students were enlisted, the University of Leipzig was allowed to use the school's building for its own purposes. The rector's decision to move the choir boys was proved right during the bombings of 20 February 1944 when the school's buildings were destroyed. After that, the remaining pupils attended 41. Volksschule on the Hillerstraße. At some stage, the choir boys rejoined these pupils at Hillerstraße.

In 1973 the school moved into a new building in the Pestalozzistraße (now Telemannstraße), but the boarding school remained in the Hillerstraße. The new communist regime in East Germany tried to make an exemplar atheist school out of St. Thomas school, but the church's influence was immense.

After the German reunification in 1990 the pupil's numbers increased. Since 2008 the school offers its students mathematics, natural sciences, music, and linguistic courses.

In September 2000 the school moved into the restored original building on the Hillerstraße. In 2008, there were 485 pupils and 67 teachers. Prior to 1973, all the Thomaskantors were also teachers at the school and the president of the choir was also the school's rector. Since 1973 those roles have been separated.

Foreign languages 
Cultivating classical languages is an old tradition at St. Thomas School. All students study Latin as their first or second foreign language, including the Qualification in Latin (Latinum). Combined with the modern language English the pupils learn fundamental foreign language skills. Although there are offered advanced courses (Leistungskurse) in those subjects. Interested students are welcome to take the First Certificate in English (FCE). The tradition of the school and its roots in European culture are the motive for providing Ancient Greek classes from 8th grade as well as a Qualification in Greek (Graecum). Also St. Thomas offers Romance languages, like French and Italian.

Student exchange programs and stays in Europe and in Anglo-America are possible.

Notable alumni 

 Carl Friedrich Abel - German composer and fine player on the viola da gamba, pupil of Johann Sebastian Bach
 Franz Abt - German composer
 Nicolaus von Amsdorf - German theologian and Protestant reformer
 Johann August Apel - German writer and jurist
 Armand Léon von Ardenne - German military writer and general, character in Effi Briest
 Wilhelm Friedemann Bach - eldest son and pupil of Johann Sebastian Bach
 Carl Philipp Emanuel Bach - German musician and composer, second son of Johann Sebastian Bach
 Johann Christian Bach - composer of the Classical era, tenth son of Johann Sebastian Bach
 Johann Christoph Friedrich Bach - ninth son of Johann Sebastian Bach
 Johann Gottfried Bernhard Bach - fourth son of Johann Sebastian Bach
 Karl Baedeker - German physicist
 Fritz Beblo - German city planner, architect and painter
 Christian Daniel Beck - German philologist, historian, theologian and antiquarian
 Oskar Becker - German philosopher, logician and mathematician
 Roderich Benedix - German dramatist and librettist
 Theodor Bergk - German philologist
 Otto Julius Bierbaum - German writer
 Georg Christoph Biller - German choral conductor
 Christian Ludwig Boxberg - German composer and organist
 Albert Brockhaus - German publisher and politician
 Eduard Brücklmeier - German diplomat and resistance fighter against the Nazi régime
 Conrad Bursian - German philologist and archaeologist
 Johann Benedict Carpzov II - German Christian theologian and Hebraist
 Carl Gustav Carus - German physiologist and painter
 Julius Schnorr von Carolsfeld - German painter
 Walter Cramer - German businessman and a member of the failed July 20 Plot
 Karl Wilhelm Dindorf - German classical scholar
 Max Dieckmann - German physicist
 Christoph von Dohnányi - German conductor
 Klaus von Dohnanyi - German politician
 Georg Dohrn – German conductor
 Axel Eggebrecht - German journalist and writer
 Theodor Wilhelm Engelmann - German botanist, physiologist and microbiologist
 Georg Fabricius - German poet, historian and archaeologist
 Johann Friedrich Fasch - German composer
 Paul Fleming - German poet
 Arnold Gehlen - an influential conservative German philosopher and sociologist
 Reinhard Goerdeler - German accountant and founder of KPMG
 Johann Gottlieb Görner - German composer and organist, pupil of Johann Sebastian Bach
 Johann Christoph Graupner - German harpsichordist and composer of high Baroque music
 Andreas Gruentzig - German cardiologist
 Karl Heine - lawyer and a major entrepreneur and industrial pioneer
 Thomas Theodor Heine - German painter and illustrator
 Johann David Heinichen - German Baroque composer and music theorist, Kapellmeister to the Royal Polish and Electoral Saxon Court in Dresden
 Karl Heinrich Heydenreich - German philosopher and poet
 Rudolf Hildebrand - Germanist
 Karl von Hochmuth - Russian General
 Otto Hoetzsch - German academic and politician
 Reinhard Keiser - popular German opera composer, one time Kapellmeister of the Hamburg Opera and successor to Johann Mattheson as Cantor (church) of Hamburg Cathedral
 Johann Friedrich Kind - German dramatist
 Johann Ludwig Krebs - Rococo and Classical period musician and composer, pupil of Johann Sebastian Bach and son of Johann Tobias Krebs, another Bach pupil (during his tenure at Weimar)
 Sebastian Krumbiegel - German singer and musician
 Victor Lange - German-born US-American Germanist at Princeton University
 Gottfried Leibniz - German mathematician and philosopher
 Justus Hermann Lipsius - German classical scholar
 Christian Gustav Adolph Mayer - German mathematician
 Erhard Mauersberger - German choral conductor, 14th Cantor of the Thomaskirche zu Leipzig after Johann Sebastian Bach, brother of Rudolf Mauersberger (the composer, conductor, and Cantor of the Kreuzkirche Dresden)
 Felix Moscheles - English painter, peace activist and advocate of Esperanto
 Paul Julius Möbius - German neurologist
 Georg Österreich - German Baroque composer
 Carl Adam Petri - German mathematician and computer scientist
 Eduard Friedrich Poeppig - German botanist, zoologist and explorer
 Nikolaus Pevsner - German-born British scholar of history of art at Cambridge and Oxford University
 Johann Georg Pisendel - German Baroque musician, violinist and composer
 Die Prinzen - German music group
 Günther Ramin - influential German organist, conductor, composer, pedagogue, and 12th Thomaskantor after Bach
 Carl Gottlieb Reissiger - German Kapellmeister and composer
 Martin Rinkart - German clergyman and hymnist
 Johann Friedrich Rochlitz - German playwright, musicologist, art and music critic
 Johann Theodor Roemhildt - German Baroque composer
 Johann Rosenmüller - German Baroque composer
 Friedrich Ruge - Vice Admiral of the German Navy
 Ernest Sauter - German composer
 Daniel Gottlob Moritz Schreber - German physician and university teacher
 Johann Andreas Schubert - German general engineer and designer
 Johann Gottfried Stallbaum - German classical scholar
 David Timm (born 1969) – German pianist, organist, choral conductor and jazz musician
 Karl Wilhelm Valentiner - German astronomer
 Eduard Vogel - German explorer in Central Africa
 Richard Wagner - German composer, conductor, music theorist and essayist
 Jörg-Peter Weigle - German professor of choir direction
 Friedrich Wieck - German piano and voice teacher, teacher of Robert Schumann, and father of Clara Schumann
 Friedrich Wilhelm Zachau - German Baroque musician and composer, teacher of George Frideric Handel
 Carl Friedrich Zöllner - German composer and choir director

Notable former teachers 
 Johann Sebastian Bach - monumental German Baroque composer and organist
 Karl Ferdinand Braun - German inventor, physicist and Nobel Prize laureate
 Sethus Calvisius - German music theorist, composer, chronologer, astronomer and teacher of the late Renaissance
 Otto Crusius - German classical scholar
 Johann August Ernesti - German theologian and philologist
 Georg Fabricius - German poet, historian and archaeologist
 Johann Matthias Gesner - German classical scholar and schoolmaster, an ardent enthusiast of Johann Sebastian Bach
 Moritz Hauptmann - German composer and writer, 6th Cantor (church) of the Thomanerchor after Bach
 Sebastian Knüpfer - German Baroque composer, 3rd Thomaskantor before Bach
 Johann Kuhnau - German Baroque composer, organist and harpsichordist, immediate predecessor as Thomaskantor before Bach
 August Leskien - German linguist
 Johann Adam Hiller - German Classical and Romantic composer, conductor and writer on music, 3rd Thomaskantor after Bach, first Kapellmeister of the Gewandhaus Orchestra Leipzig
 Rudolf Hildebrand - Germanist
 Johann Rosenmüller - German Baroque composer
 Günther Ramin - influential German organist, conductor, composer, pedagogue, and 12th Thomaskantor after Bach
 Georg Rhau - German publisher and composer, first Thomaskantor after church became Protestant, led the Thomanerchor in the opening Mass of the Leipzig Debate, published last known Lutheran Hymnbook during Martin Luther's lifetime
 Ernst Richter - German musical theorist, 8th Thomaskantor after Bach and the immediate predecessor to the post of Wilhelm Rust
 Wilhelm Rust - German musicologist, conductor, and composer, 9th Thomaskantor after Bach
 Johann Hermann Schein - German composer and hymnist of the early Baroque era
 Johann Gottfried Schicht - German composer and conductor, 5th Thomaskantor after Bach
 Karl Straube - German church musician, organist, choral conductor, and teacher, 11th Thomaskantor after Bach, a friend and champion of Max Reger, instructor at the Leipzig Conservatory, and one of the teachers of Karl Richter (conductor); succeeded to the post of Thomaskantor by Günther Ramin
 Jakob Thomasius - German academic philosopher and jurist
 Christian Theodor Weinlig - German music teacher, composer and choir conductor
 Ernst Windisch - German scholar and celticist
 Gustav Ernst Schreck - German composer,  music teacher, choirmaster, 1983 Thomaskantor

See also 
 List of rectors of Thomasschule zu Leipzig
 St. Thomas Church, Leipzig
 St. Thomas Choir of Leipzig
 List of the oldest schools in the world

References

External links 

 Thomasschule zu Leipzig
 Thomasschule

 
1212 establishments in Europe
Boarding schools in Germany
Education in Leipzig
Educational institutions established in the 13th century
Gymnasiums in Germany
Music schools in Germany
Buildings and structures in Leipzig
Schools in Saxony